Alisa van Oijen (born 1 October 1992) is an Austrian former professional racing cyclist. She was born in the Netherlands and moved to Austria at the age of six. From 2014 to 2015, van Oijen was riding for the women's UCI team NÖ Radunion Vitalogic. In 2017, she rides for the German amateur team Maxx-Solar Cycling Team. Her best career result so far has been a 7th place in the road race of the 2014 Austrian championships as well as several medals in U23 competitions.

References

External links
 

1992 births
Living people
Austrian female cyclists
Sportspeople from Apeldoorn
Cyclists from Gelderland
Dutch emigrants to Austria